St. Mary of the Angels may refer to:

Australia
 St Mary of the Angels Basilica, Geelong

Chile
 St. Mary of the Angels Cathedral (Los Ángeles, Chile)

France
 Former name of the Temple du Marais in Paris

India
 Franciscan Sisters of St. Mary of the Angels, administrators of St. Mary's Convent School, Ujjain

Italy
 Papal Basilica of Saint Mary of the Angels in Assisi, the founding place of the Franciscan Order
 St. Mary of the Angels Monastery (Florence), a defunct formerly-famous Camaldolese abbey
 Santa Maria degli Angeli, Florence, the former church of a now-defunct monastery
 Santa Maria degli Angeli e dei Martiri, built inside the frigidarium of the Baths of Diocletian in Rome

New Zealand
 St Mary of the Angels, Wellington, a church in Wellington

Singapore
 Church of St Mary of the Angels, a church in Bukit Batok New Town

United Kingdom
 St Mary of the Angels, Bayswater, a church in Bayswater, London, England
 St Mary of the Angels, Liverpool, England, a church in Liverpool, England
 St Mary of the Angels Roman Catholic Church, Canton, a church in Cardiff, Wales
 St Mary of the Angels, Worthing, a church in Worthing, England
 Church of St Mary of the Angels, Hooton, a church in Welsh Road, Hooton, Cheshire, England
 St Mary of the Angels Church, Brownshill, a church in Gloucestershire, England

United States
 St. Mary of the Angels Church, Hollywood, California
 St. Mary of the Angels (Chicago), a historically Polish church in Chicago, Illinois
 St. Mary of the Angels Motherhouse Complex (Amherst, New York), the former motherhouse of the Franciscan Sisters of Buffalo, listed on the NRHP
 St. Mary of the Angels Home, a Catholic charity in the Roman Catholic Archdiocese of New York
 St. Mary of the Angels Church and Monastery, Green Bay, Wisconsin
 St. Mary of the Angels Basilica, Olean, New York

See also
 Basilica of Our Lady of the Angels (disambiguation)
 Queen of Angels (disambiguation)
 St. Mary's Church (disambiguation): includes St. Mary's Church, St. Mary the Virgin's Church, St. Mary Church, Saint Mary Church, and other variations